Leslie William "Les" Jones (1 October 1922 – 22 May 1989) was an Australian rules footballer who played with Richmond in the Victorian Football League (VFL).

Jones, a follower, made his league debut in round 18 of the 1944 VFL season. He played a preliminary final in his second VFL appearance and his third senior game was the 1944 Grand Final, which Richmond lost to Fitzroy. On Grand Final day he injured his leg and had to be replaced by the 19th man Keith Cook at half-time. His appearance was only made possible when he was granted leave from the Army. After leaving Richmond he captain-coached Yallourn.

References

1922 births
1989 deaths
Australian rules footballers from Melbourne
Richmond Football Club players
Chelsea Football Club (Australia) players
Australian Army personnel of World War II
Australian Army soldiers
Military personnel from Melbourne
People from Chelsea, Victoria